The United States Army Corps of Engineers South Atlantic Division (SAD) is one of the eight permanent divisions of the Army organization, providing civil works and military water resource services/infrastructure.  lolIt also supports economically viable and environmentally sustainable watershed management and water resources development in its territory.    

The Division, headquartered in Atlanta, stretches from North Carolina to Alabama as well as the Caribbean, and Central and South America.  It covers all or parts of six states.  One-third of the stateside Army and one-fifth of the stateside Air Force are located within the division boundaries. The largest single environmental restoration project in the world — the Everglades Restoration — is managed by SAD.

The Division Commander is directly responsible to the Chief of Engineers. The SAD Commander directs and supervises the individual District Commanders.

SAD duties include:

 Preparing engineering studies and design.
 Constructing, operating, and maintaining flood control and river and harbor facilities and installations.
 Administering the laws on civil works activities.
 Acquiring, managing, and disposing of real estate.
 Mobilization support of military, natural disaster, and national emergency operations.

Districts 

The Division's five districts are headquartered in:

South Atlantic Division

Jacksonville District 

Charleston District 

Mobile District  

Savannah District 

Wilmington District 

 Wilmington, North Carolina
 Charleston, South Carolina
 Savannah, Georgia
 Jacksonville, Florida
 Mobile, Alabama
 Atlanta, Georgia

External links
USACE South Atlantic Division website

Divisions of the United States Army Corps of Engineers